Palm Bus is a brand of bus services serving the Southern French city of Cannes, France. The operator, Veolia Transport Cannes is responsible for operating the Bus Azur buses for SITP, grouping the communes of Cannes, le Cannet et Mandelieu-la-Napoule, Théoule-sur-Mer and Mougins

,

History
The city of Cannes was, until 1933, served by an urban tramway system, the Tramway de Cannes, as well as an inter-urban tramway, the Tramway de Nice et du Littoral until 1953.

The first bus services within Cannes and between Cannes and le Cannet began in 1936. Cannes bus company operated four lines:
Cannes to le Cannet
Cannes to Rocheville
Cannes to Cannes-la-Bocca
Cannes to la Croisette
Each of the lines were divided in two fare zones. In 1954, the concession for operation of buses in Cannes was given to Société des Transports Urbains de Cannes by the Syndicat Intercommunal des Transports Publics for twenty years. Several lines were created during the 1960s, linking Cannes to la Californie, Cannes and le Cannet via République and Cannes to l'Aubarède. Lines were divided into four fare zones. In 1968, severe strikes forced the company to reduce its staff presence on buses to one.

The STUC's concession was extended by ten years in 1974 thanks to a grant to the STIP. The company adopted a new ticketing system, using magnetic strip cards. Lines were grouped into two global fare zones in replacement of the four per line. Service was increased with the purchase of more rolling stock. Within two years, stock and staff numbers doubled.

In 1978, the STUC purchased a diesel multiple unit X 94630 for use on the Cannes-Ranguin railway line. Service was eleven minutes in length and bus ticketing used.

The concession was once more extended, for five years, in 1984, with further bus purchases and the repainting of the X 94630 into the line's colours. rail services ended in 1995 due to loss of revenue. On 5 November 1996, CGFTE Cannes signed a contract delegating services. In 2004, Bus Azur introduced double-decker buses on its line 8 quai Laubeuf-La Croisette-Palm Beach.

References

External links
Company website

Public transport in France
Bus transport in France